Janet Daly (born 12 January 1969) is an Australian short track speed skater. She competed in two events at the 1998 Winter Olympics.

References

External links
 

1969 births
Living people
Australian female short track speed skaters
Olympic short track speed skaters of Australia
Short track speed skaters at the 1998 Winter Olympics
Sportspeople from Brisbane